Liviu Ciulei (7 July 1923 – 24 October 2011) was a Romanian theater and film director, film writer, actor, architect, educator, costume and set designer. During a career spanning over 50 years, he was described by Newsweek as "one of the boldest and most challenging figures on the international scene".

Ciulei is known for winning the Best Director Award at the 1965 Cannes Film Festival for his film Forest of the Hanged. In 1992 he was elected corresponding member of the Romanian Academy. He received a star on the Romanian Walk of Fame in Bucharest on 13 December 2012.

Biography
Born in Bucharest to Liviu Ciulley [sic], a lawyer and constructor, he  
studied at the Gheorghe Lazăr High School. Ciulei then studied architecture and theater at the Royal Conservatory of Music and Theatre. He made his theater debut in 1946, as Puck in an Odeon Theatre production of Shakespeare's A Midsummer Night's Dream. Soon after, he joined the theater company known as Teatrul Municipal din București, later renamed Teatrul Bulandra, and directed his first stage production in 1957 – The Rainmaker.

In 1961, Ciulei gained an overall recognition for his version of Shakespeare's As You Like It. In the same year, he was a member of the jury at the 2nd Moscow International Film Festival. He was the recipient of the Directors' Award at the 1965 Cannes Film Festival for Forest of the Hanged, the film version of Liviu Rebreanu's eponymous novel, where he also starred in the role of Otto Klapka. In the 1980s, he was marginalized by the Communist regime and transferred to work at the Sahia film studio, as documentary filmmaker.

Ciulei was the artistic director of Teatrul Bulandra for more than a decade. During his tenure at the Bulandra he staged a wide range of classics. His Shakespeare productions include "As You Like it" "Macbeth" and "The Tempest", which was awarded Romania's Critics' Prize for Best Production of 1979. Also at the Bulandra, he staged such European classics as Maxim Gorky's "The Lower Depths" and "The Children of the Sun", Georg Büchner's "Danton's Death" and "Leonce and Lena", and Bertolt Brecht's "Threepenny Opera". His productions of American classics include Tennessee Williams' "A Streetcar Named Desire", William Saroyan's "The Time of Your Life", and Eugene O'Neill's "Long Day Journey into Night". Ciulei was a guest director in many theaters around the world: in West Berlin, Paris, Göttingen, Düsseldorf, Munich, and Vancouver. In Sydney, he won the 1977 Australian Critics'Award for his production of "The Lower Depths". In 1974 he made his American debut at the Arena Stage in Washington, D.C., as director and designer with "Leonce and Lena". In 1980 he directed and created sets for Dmitri Shostakovich's opera "Lady Macbeth of Mtsensk" at the Spoleto Festival in Italy: and in May 1982, he redirected the same opera for the Lyric Opera of Chicago.  Between 1980 and 1985, he was the artistic director of the Guthrie Theater in Minneapolis. At the Guthrie he directed "The Tempest", "Eve of Retirement", "As You Like it", "Requiem for a Nun", "Peer Gynt", "The Threepenny Opera", "Three Sisters", "Twelfth Night", and "A Midsummer Night's Dream", among others.

From 1986 to 1990, Ciulei taught theater direction at Columbia University in New York, in the MFA program in theatre arts. Later, New York University made him a better offer to teach graduate acting, and he accepted an appointment at the university from 1991 to 1995.

After the Romanian Revolution of 1989, back in his native Romania, Ciulei directed a series of stage productions that were both publicly and critically acclaimed. He was named Honorary Director of the theater he has always loved the most, Bulandra. Besides being the costume and set designer of the majority of his own productions, Ciulei, as an architect, contributed to the rebuilding of the auditorium of the Bulandra Theatre.

Family
He was first married to actress , and then to scenographer Ioana Gǎrdescu. He remarried, to German journalist Helga Reiter, whose son from a previous marriage (Thomas Ciulei, now a film director) he adopted.

Death
Ciulei died on 24 October 2011 in a hospital in Munich, aged 88; he had been suffering from multiple illnesses. His body was cremated, and the subject was brought up in television debates regarding Sergiu Nicolaescu's cremation in 2013 as to how the act of cremation is not sanctioned by the Romanian Orthodox Church.

Filmography
 În sat la noi (1951) as Dumitru
 Mitrea Cocor (1951, writer)
 Nepoții gornistului (1953, writer) as Bulldogul
 Răsare soarele (1954, writer) as Bulldogul
 Alarmă în munți (1955)
 Pasărea furtunii (1957, writer)
  (1957, director)
  (1960, director) as Mihai
  (1960) as Bogdan
  (1962)
 Pădurea spânzuraților (1965, director) as Captain Otto Klapka
  (1971) as Old pilot Barcan
  (1971, writer) as Manicatide
  (1972)
 Ceața (1973) as Comisarul șef
  (1973)
  (1975) as Leibnitz
  (1975) as Vogoride
 O scrisoare pierdută (1977, writer/director)
  (1979) as Dinicu Golescu (final film role)

References

Sources
 Miruna Runcan, Teatralizarea si reteatralizarea teatrului in Romania. 1920–1960, Cluj, Editura Eik0n, seria Bibilioteca teatrul Imposibil, 2003

External links
 
 

1923 births
2011 deaths
Architects from Bucharest
Romanian male film actors
Romanian film directors
Romanian costume designers
Romanian scenic designers
Romanian theatre directors
Romanian theatre managers and producers
Theatre people from Bucharest
Gheorghe Lazăr National College (Bucharest) alumni
Cannes Film Festival Award for Best Director winners
Grand Officers of the Order of the Star of Romania
National University of Music Bucharest alumni
Corresponding members of the Romanian Academy